Elachista dalmatiensis is a moth of the family Elachistidae that is endemic to Austria.

References

dalmatiensis
Moths described in 1992
Moths of Europe
Endemic fauna of Austria